Papia of Envermeu, also called Poppa of Envermeu, was the second consort of Richard II, Duke of Normandy.  

Papia belonged to the local Norman aristocracy as the daughter of Richeldis of Envermeu. She married Richard II after the death of his first spouse, Judith of Brittany in 1017. She became the mother of Mauger, Archbishop of Rouen, and William of Talou. Papia is documented to have made a donation to the cathedral of Rouen together with her mother.

Issue 

Mauger (c. 1019), Archbishop of Rouen
William (c. 1020/5), count of Arques

References

Sources

11th-century Norman women
Duchesses of Normandy